Guatemala competed in the 2019 Pan American Games in Lima, Peru from July 26 to August 11, 2019.

The Guatemalan team consisted of 147 athletes (74 men and 73 women) that competed in 29 sports.

On July 3, 2019, gymnast Jorge Vega was named as the country's flag bearer during the opening ceremony.

Medalists

The following Guatemalan competitors won medals at the games.

|  style="text-align:left; width:78%; vertical-align:top;"|

|  style="text-align:left; width:26%; vertical-align:top;"|

Competitors
The following is the list of number of competitors (per gender) participating at the games per sport/discipline.

Archery

Men

Women

Mixed

Artistic swimming

Guatemala qualified a full team of nine artistic swimmers.

Women

Keren Rivera was the reserve swimmer.

Athletics (track and field)

Guatemala qualified ten track and field athletes (seven men and three women).

Key
PB = Personal best
SB = Seasonal best
DNF = Did not finish
DSQ = Disqualified

Men
Track and road events

Women
Road events

Badminton

Guatemala qualified a team of seven badminton athletes (four men and three women). Guatemala was later reallocated an additional male quota, from the original three it had originally qualified.

Singles

Doubles

Basque pelota

Guatemala qualified one athlete in basque pelota.

Men

Beach volleyball

Guatemala qualified four beach volleyball athletes (two men and two women).

Bodybuilding

Guatemala qualified a full team of two bodybuilders (one male and one female).

No results were provided for the prejudging round, with only the top six advancing.

Boxing

Guatemala qualified one woman boxer.

Women

Bowling

Canoeing

Sprint
Guatemala qualified two athletes in canoe sprint (one per gender).

Position is within the heat, SF – Qualified for the semifinals, F – Qualified for the final

Cycling

Guatemala qualified eight cyclists (five men and three women).

BMX
Guatemala entered two athletes (one per gender) in the BMX racing event.

Mountain biking
Guatemala entered one male in the cross-country event.

Men

Road
Four cyclists (three men and one woman) competed in the road events.

Track

Equestrian

Guatemala qualified a full team of 12 equestrians (four per discipline). However, only 9 combinations competed.

Dressage

Eventing

Jumping

Golf

Guatemala qualified a full team of four golfers (two men and two women).

Gymnastics

Artistic
Guatemala qualified one male and one female artistic gymnast.

Men

Women

Judo

Guatemala qualified two judoka (one male and one female).

Karate

Guatemala qualified two karateka (one per gender).

Kumite
Men

Modern Pentathlon

Guatemala qualified five modern pentathletes (two men and three women).

Men
2 quotas

Women
3 quotas

Racquetball

Guatemala qualified four racquetball athletes (two men and two women).

Men

Women

Roller sports

Rowing

Women

Sailing

Guatemala qualified seven sailors and five boats. The team consisted of four men and three women.

Key
STP= Standard penalty
UFD= U flag disqualification

Shooting

Guatemala qualified 21 sport shooters (11 men and ten women). The nation entered only 16 sport shooters (9 men and 7 women).

Men

Women

Mixed

Squash

Men

Swimming

Guatemala qualified four swimmers (two per gender). Guatemala also qualified four open water swimmers (two per gender).

Men

Women

Table tennis

Guatemala qualified two men and three women table tennis players.

Men

Women

Mixed

Taekwondo

Guatemala qualified six taekwondo athletes (three per gender). Five contested the poomsae events, while one competed in kyorugi.

Kyorugi
Women

Poomsae

Tennis

Men

Women

Mixed

Triathlon

Individual

Weightlifting

Guatemala qualified six weightlifters (three men and three women).

Wrestling

Guatemala received one wild card in the Greco-Roman discipline.

Men

See also
Guatemala at the 2020 Summer Olympics

References

Nations at the 2019 Pan American Games
Pan American Games
2019